Balaji Rao (born 31 March 1938) is an Indian former cricketer. He played first-class cricket for several domestic teams in India between 1955 and 1972.

See also
 List of Delhi cricketers

References

External links
 

1938 births
Living people
Indian cricketers
Andhra cricketers
Delhi cricketers
Tamil Nadu cricketers
Services cricketers
Uttar Pradesh cricketers
Cricketers from Kerala